Alex Misael Suligoy (born 3 December 1990 in Malabrigo) is an Argentine rifle shooter. He competed in the 50 m rifle prone event at the 2012 Summer Olympics, where he placed 20th. Alex won the silver medal at the 2011 Pan American Games.

References

1990 births
Living people
Argentine male sport shooters
Olympic shooters of Argentina
Shooters at the 2012 Summer Olympics
Pan American Games medalists in shooting
Pan American Games silver medalists for Argentina
South American Games bronze medalists for Argentina
South American Games medalists in shooting
Shooters at the 2011 Pan American Games
Competitors at the 2010 South American Games
Medalists at the 2011 Pan American Games